9W or 9-W may refer to:

Units of measurement
9°W, or 9th meridian west, a longitude coordinate
9 watts
9 weeks
9 wins, abbreviated in a Win–loss record (pitching)

Transportation
9W, IATA code for Jet Airways
List of highways numbered 9W
U.S. Route 9W, a highway in the states of New York & New Jersey
New York State Route 9W
Mississippi Highway 9W
GE BB40-9W locomotive
C44-9W, a model of GE Dash 9-44CW locomotive
C40-9W, a model of GE Dash 9-40CW locomotive
Z-9W, a model of Harbin Z-9

See also
W9 (disambiguation)